The Archbishop of Nazareth is a former residential Metropolitan see, first in the Holy Land, then in Apulian exile in Barletta (southern Italy), which had a Latin and a Maronite successor as titular sees, the first merged into Barletta, the second suppressed.

History 
Biblical Nazareth was one of the major sees of the Latin Patriarch of Jerusalem during the crusades. After capturing Nazareth, the leaders of the First Crusade moved there the Metropolitan see of Scythopolis, while the Greek Orthodox continued to maintain two separate dioceses.
 
Nazareth thus became a Latin Church Metropolitan Archdiocese circa 1100. Among its suffragans were the Bishopric of Tiberias and the Abbot of Mount Tabor.

Following the Muslim conquest in the Holy Land, the Archbishops of Nazareth took refuge in Barletta (Apulia, southern Italy), and moved permanently there in 1327. It began the long line of Metropolitan Archbishops of Nazareth residing in Barletta, which was called the see of Nazareth in Barletta.

On June 27, 1818, with the papal bull De ulteriori of Pope Pius VII, the Archdiocese of Nazareth was suppressed.

On 22 October 1828, with the Bull Multis quidem of Pope Leo XII, the title of Archbishop of Nazareth was granted to the Archbishops of Trani.

By mergers, the title passed again to the restyled Archbishops of Trani-Barletta (1860) and then to the Archbishops of Trani-Barletta-Bisceglie (1986).

Metropolitan Archbishops of and in Nazareth 
(all Roman Rite)

 Bernard (c. 1120) [4]
 William (1129–1138)
 Robert I (1138–1151)
 Robert II (1151–?)
 Attard (?–1159)
 Letard (1160–1190)
 Gervasio (?–1222)
 Nicholas (c. 1230)
 Hugh (1231–1239)
 Henry (1239–1268)
 Guy (1273–1288)
 William of St. John, Knights Templar (O.Templ.) (1288–?)
 Peter (?–1326)

Metropolitan Archbishops of Nazareth in Barletta 
(all Roman Rite)

Metropolitan Archbishops of Nazareth in Barletta
Yvo (1327–1330)
Pietro of Naples, Dominican Order (O.P.) † (1330–1345)
Durando, Carmelite Order (O.Carm.) (1345–1348)
Riccardo, O.F.M. (1348–1366)
Guglielmo Belvaysius, O.P. (1366–1369)
Giovanni Salomoni, O.P. (1369–1380)
Giordano Estublans, O.P. (1381–?)
Giovanni Alessio (1390–1400)
Paolo di Arezzo, Friars Minor (O.F.M.) (1400–1431)
Agostino Favaroni, Augustinian Order (O.E.S.A.) (1431–1443)
Marino Orsini (1445–?)

Metropolitan Archbishops of Nazareth in Barletta-Cann(a)e, having absorbed the title of Bishop of Cannae 
Giacomo de Aurilia, O.F.M. (1455–1483)
Giovanni de Barthon, (1483–1491)
Giovanni Maria Poderico (1491–1510)
Orlando Carretto Della Rovere (1510–1512)
Giorgio Benigno Salviati, O.F.M. (1513–1520)
Leonardo Baccuto (1520–1525)
Pietro De Albis (1525–1526)
Apostolic administrator Ercole Rangone (1526), while **
Pietro Francesco Ferro (1526)
Giovanni Francesco Cina (1527)
Filippo Adimari (1528–1536)Metropolitan Archbishops of Nazareth in Barletta-Canne-Monteverde''
 Gerolamo de Caro (1536–1552)
 Bernardino Figueroa (1553–1571)
 Fabio Mirto Frangipani (1572–1587)
 Francesco Spera, Order of Friars Minor (O.F.M.) (1587)
 Girolamo Bevilacqua, O.F.M. (1587–1604)
 Maffeo Barberini (1604–1608), elected pope Urban VIII)
 Michelangelo Tonti (1608–1609)
 Domenico Rivarola (1609–1627)
 Antonio Lombardi (1627–1636)
 Antonio Severoli (1639–1666)
 Francesco Antonio De Luca (1667–1676)
 Marziale Pellegrini, Conventual Franciscans (O.F.M. Conv.) (1677–1685)
 Filippo Condulmari (1685–1688)
 Giuseppe Rosa (1690–1694)
 Domenico Folgori (1695–1706)
 Giulio Piazza (1706–1710)
 Girolamo Mattei (1710–1712)
 Salvatore Miroballo (1717–1726)
 Giovanni Crisostomo Bianchi, O.E.S.A. (1726)
 Nicola Iorio (1726–1744)
 Antonio Marulli De Galiberti (1745–1751)
 Giusto De Marco,  (C.R.) (1751–1769)
 Pasquale Maria Mastrillo, C.R. (1769–1783)
 Giuseppe Mormile, C.R. (1792–1801).

Titular successor sees

Latin Titular Archbishopric of Nazareth 
(all Roman Rite)

On 21 April 1860, the archdiocese was nominally restored as Metropolitan Titular archbishopric of Nazareth.

In 1925 it was suppressed, only to be restored in 1929 and finally united with (i.e. merged into) the residential Metropolitan Archdiocese of Trani–Barletta–Bisceglie, also territorial heir to the former Apulian see in exile.

It has had the following archiepiscopal incumbents, apparently all of the highest (Metropolitan) rank :
 Giuseppe de' Bianchi Dottula (1860.04.21 – 1892.09.22)
 Domenico Marinangeli (1893.01.16 – 1898.01.08), as former Bishop of Foggia (Italy) (1882.03.27 – 1893.01.16) and Metropolitan Archbishop of Trani e Barletta (Italy) (1893.01.16 – 1898.01.08), later Latin Titular Patriarch of Alexandria (1898.01.08 – 1921.03.06)
 Tommaso de Stefano (1898.03.24 – 1906.05.19)
 Francesco Paolo Carrano (1906.09.01 – 1915.03.18)
 Giovanni Régine (1915.12.06 – 1918.10.04)
 Giuseppe Maria Leo (1920.01.17 – 1925)
 Paul Auad (1941.06.14 – 1944.06.28)
 Reginaldo Giuseppe Maria Addazi, Dominican Order (O.P.) (1947.11.10 – 1971.07.03)
 Giuseppe Carata (1971.08.28 – 1989).

Maronite Titular (Arch)Bishopric of Nazareth 
(Antiochian Rite)

It was established in the late 19th century as a Titular bishopric of the lowest (episcopal) rank, but suppressed in 1911, having had a single incumbent :
 Titular Bishop Youhanna Habib (1889 – 1894.06.04).

In 1926 it was restored, now as a Titular archbishopric of the intermediate (non-Metropolitan) rank. In 1939 it was again suppressed, having had the following incumbents :
 Titular Archbishop Paul Auad (1896.09.24 – 1911.02.11)
 Titular Archbishop Elias Richa (1926.06.21 – 1937.10.10).

See also 
 List of Catholic dioceses in Holy land and Cyprus
 List of Catholic dioceses in Italy
 Lordship of Nazareth, feudal territory in the crusader Kingdom of Jerusalem
 Roman Catholic Diocese of Bethléem à Clamecy, fellow crusader bishopric in (French) exile

References

Sources and external links 
 GCatholic, Latin former sees and former titular see, with incumbent biography links
 GCatholic, Maronite titular see, with incumbent biography links
 Scythopolis (Titular See) from Catholic-Hierarchy.org
 Scythopolis from the Catholic Encyclopedia

Catholic titular sees in Asia
Roman Catholic dioceses in the Crusader states
Eastern Catholic titular sees
Christianity in the Kingdom of Jerusalem
Former Roman Catholic dioceses in Europe